Kake may refer to:

Kake, Alaska
Kake, Hiroshima
Kake (comics), comic book series and fictional character created by Tom of Finland
KAKE (TV), channel 10 serving Wichita, Kansas (and most of the state's outlying areas)

People with the surname
Patrick Kake, New Zealand actor

See also
Cake (disambiguation)